HD 47186 is a star located approximately 129 light-years away in the constellation of Canis Major. It is a G6V star with the characteristics very similar to the Sun, but it is 1.7 times more metal-rich. In 2008, two extrasolar planets were discovered orbiting the star.

Planetary system 

Announced in June 2008, two extrasolar planets were discovered orbiting the star. Both planets are less massive than Jupiter. The inner planet HD 47186 b orbits close to the star and is termed a “hot Neptune”. The outer planet HD 47186 c orbits in a similar distance from the star as the asteroid Vesta, at around 2.4 AU. The inner planet orbits in a circular path while the outer planet orbits in an eccentric path.

See also 
 HD 181433
 HD 40307
 MOA-2007-BLG-192L

References

External links 
 

G-type main-sequence stars
Planetary systems with two confirmed planets
Canis Major
Durchmusterung objects
047186
031540